Brainwashed (original title Schachnovelle, "Chess Novella") is a 1960 German drama film directed by Gerd Oswald and starring Curt Jürgens, Claire Bloom and Hansjörg Felmy. It is based on Stefan Zweig's novella The Royal Game.

Plot 

Chess world champion Centowic wants to travel by ship to an important chess tournament. The ship, however, starts behind schedule, because a mysterious and obviously anxious passenger, who is on his way to the port with Bishop Ambrosse, is expected.

During the trip, passengers ask grumpy Centowic to play a chess game, which he reluctantly agrees to. Centowic's opponents are about to lose the match. However, the mysterious passenger, who accidentally joins the scene, intervenes and helps them to turn the match into a draw. Centowic is amazed to not have ever seen the stranger, who, as he says, has just had his first chess piece in his hands, at any important tournament.

A flashback tells the stranger's story: He is Werner von Basil, an Austrian lawyer. Together with Bishop Ambrosse, he hides art treasures abroad in order to protect them from the national socialists who had just occupied Austria. Von Basil doesn't take the bishop's warnings about the threat for him too seriously. On a party given by von Basil, the newly inaugurated Gestapo man, Hans Berger engages ballet dancer Irene Andreny, who is his girlfriend, to learn from von Basil where the art treasures are. When she is unsuccessful, Berger has von Basil arrested the same evening. In order to break von Basil's will, Berger puts him into solitary confinement. Von Basil has all his personal belongings taken from him; the only variety in his every-day routine is the guardian who provides him with food.

Berger is pressured not only by Irene, who feels neglected, but also by his superior Hartmann, as von Basil keeps the hiding-place of the art treasures a secret even after six weeks of isolation. As von Basil pretends to be cooperative and is brought to a questioning, he succeeds in stealing a book from a coat pocket. In the questioning, von Basil drops Berger in it and feels the sympathy the present Irene feels for him. Back again in his room, von Basil is disappointed to learn that the book he has stolen just deals with chess matches. Due to a lack of alternatives, von Basil reads it and uses pieces of bread as chess pieces to re-enact the matches described in the book. Even as Berger discovers his secret and deprives him of the book, von Basil plays chess against himself in his mind.

After asking bishop Ambrose for help, Irene begs Berger to release von Basil but is insulted by Berger. As von Basil suffers from a nervous breakdown but still refuses to reveal his secrets, Hartmann now tries on his own to break von Basil's will.

As von Basil plays yet another match against Centowic, he furiously attacks Centowic, as he wants to learn from Centowic how much information he gave away during his solitary confinement. Irene joins the scene and is able to assure von Basil that he revealed none of his secrets. Irene was spared harassment; Berger was no longer of use for his superiors. Von Basil and Irene fall in love with each other.

Cast 
Curd Jürgens — von Basil
Hansjörg Felmy — Berger
Mario Adorf — Karl Centowic
Claire Bloom — Irene Andreny
Hans Söhnker — Bishop Ambrosse
Albert Bessler — Scientist
Rudolf Forster — Hotel manager
Alan Gifford — Mac Iver
Jan Hendriks — First Officer
Albert Lieven — Hartmann
Harald Maresch — Ballet Master
Dietmar Schönherr — Rabbi
Karel Stepanek — Baranow
Wolfgang Wahl — von Basils' Guardian, called Moonface
Dorothea Wieck — Countess
Rijk de Gooyer — Berger's Secretary
Susanne Körber-Harlan — Young Lady

References

External links
 

1960 films
1960 drama films
German drama films
West German films
Films directed by Gerd Oswald
Films based on Austrian novels
Films based on works by Stefan Zweig
German black-and-white films
1960s German-language films
Films about chess
Films set on ships
Films about Nazi Germany
Allied Artists films
1960s German films